The Kayser Mountains is a mountain range in the Sipaliwini District of Suriname. It is named after . The Kayser Airstrip was built in 1960 at the foot of the mountains as part of Operation Grasshopper to access the interior of Suriname.

Reference
 

Mountain ranges of Suriname